Silat al-Harithiya is a Palestinian village in the Jenin Governorate, located  northwest of Jenin in the northern West Bank. According to the Palestinian Central Bureau of Statistics census, the town had a population of 9,422 in 2007.

History
Pottery remains from the Roman, Byzantine, early Muslim and the Middle Ages have been found here.

Ottoman era
In 1799, in the Ottoman era, men from Silat al-Harithiya fought Napoleon's invading forces in the Jezreel Valley plain.  In 1838 Edward Robinson noted   it  among many other villages on the plain; Lajjun, Umm al-Fahm, Ti'inik, Kafr Dan, Al-Yamun and el Barid.

In 1870 Victor Guérin   noted that Sileh  was a large village of 1,000 inhabitants; it was surrounded by gardens planted with fig trees, pomegranates and some vines. In the valley that separated the two areas of which it was composed, there was a  dedicated to Sheikh Hasan,  with  three palm trees in front.

In 1882, the PEF's Survey of Western Palestine described it as "a good-sized village, well built of stone, with a spring and cisterns. There are rock-cut wine-presses on the west, and olives and figs round".

British Mandate period
Palestine, including Silat al-Harithiya, was captured by British forces during World War I and the country subsequently came under a British Mandate. In the 1922 census of Palestine, Selet al-Hartiyeh had a population of 1,041, all Muslims,  increasing in the 1931 census to 1,259 inhabitants, still all Muslims, living in 295 houses.

In the 1945 statistics   the population of Silat al-Harithiya  was 1,860, all Muslims,  with 8,931 dunams of land, according to an official land and population survey. 2,534 dunams were used for plantations and irrigable land, 1,140 dunams for cereals,  while 80 dunams were built-up (urban) land and 3,179 dunams were classified as "non-cultivable".

Jordanian era
In the wake of the 1948 Arab–Israeli War, and after the 1949 Armistice Agreements, the whole Jenin-area came under Jordanian rule, together with the rest of the West Bank.

In 1961, the population of Silet Harithiya was  2,566.

Post 1967
Since the Six-Day War in 1967, Silat al-Harithiya has been under Israeli occupation.
The Israeli occupation led  Abdullah Yusuf Azzam to leave his home in the village, and "never again set foot in Palestine." He was  later cofounder of al-Qaeda.

Notable residents
 Yusuf Abu Durra, Palestinian Arab rebel leader during 1936 revolt against British
 Abdullah Yusuf Azzam, Sunni Islamic scholar and theologian and founding member of al-Qaeda

References

Bibliography

External links
Welcome to Silat al Harithiya
Survey of Western Palestine, Map 8: IAA, Wikimedia commons 
Google map

Towns in the West Bank
Jenin Governorate
Municipalities of the State of Palestine